Johnnie Bryan Hunt, Sr. (February 28, 1927 – December 7, 2006), better known as J. B. Hunt, was an American entrepreneur who founded J.B. Hunt Transport Services, the largest publicly owned trucking company in the US. The company is based in Lowell, Arkansas.

Personal background
Hunt was born in Heber Springs, Arkansas. Growing up during the Great Depression put a large strain on him.

His first job was working for his uncle at a sawmill. After a stint in the US Army, Hunt spent the 1950s as a lumber salesman, auctioneer, and truck driver before starting a rice hulls business with his wife Johnelle  in 1961. His first attempt at the trucking business was not successful.  He lost roughly $19,000. He returned to the trucking industry in 1969, with five tractors and seven trailers.

Hunt was known for his generosity, and carried a money clip containing $100 bills, which he would hand out to people he felt could use the money.

Retirement
Hunt began to remove himself from the company when he stepped down as president in 1982 but was still a fixture in the company and remained chairman of the board until 1995. On December 31, 2004, Hunt retired from the company but remained its largest shareholder. Although retired, Hunt visited the headquarters located in Lowell, Arkansas, frequently to shake hands and converse with employees. He regularly telephoned the executive assistants to ask "What's the stock doing, Darling?"

In 2005, Springdale Public Schools opened a new elementary school named after Hunt. The Hunt family donated the land for the school, valued in excess of $500,000. This K-5 elementary school is located on Silent Grove Road in Springdale, Arkansas. Hunt was a frequent visitor to the school after it opened.

In early 2006, Hunt bought the site of the abandoned Superconducting Super Collider in Waxahachie, Texas, for $6.5 million, hoping to turn it into a secure data storage facility. His death at a hospital in Springdale, Arkansas, on December 7, 2006, after sustaining a head injury in a fall on ice five days earlier, put an end to this project. The property was sold to the chemical company Magnablend for $5 million in 2012.

Awards and honors
1993: Golden Plate Award of the American Academy of Achievement
2001: Arkansas Business Hall of Fame
2016: Council of Supply Chain Management Professionals’ (CSCMP) Hall of Fame

References

1927 births
2006 deaths
Accidental deaths from falls
United States Army soldiers
American trucking industry businesspeople
American corporate directors
People from Heber Springs, Arkansas
Accidental deaths in Arkansas
Businesspeople from Arkansas
20th-century American businesspeople